Wu Wenying, may refer to"

 , Chinese poet during the Song dynasty.

 Wu Wenying (politician), Chinese politician and minister of textile industry.